Ajrak, also known as Ajrakh, is a unique form of blockprinting found mostly in Sindh, Pakistan and Ajrakhpur, Kutch district, India. These shawls display special designs and patterns made using block printing by stamps. Over the years, ajraks have become a symbol of the Sindhi culture and traditions.
Ajrak print is also famous in neighbouring areas of India in the state of Gujarat due to their influence from Indus Valley civilization in Sindh, Pakistan. A later-on Saraiki version of Ajrak shawl was created called, Sajarak is found in South Punjab of Pakistan. Sajarak is mostly of cyan color while the simple Ajrak is of red and black.

Etymology 
The Sindhi word ajrak (اجرڪ) comes from Persian language ajar or ajor (اجر) meaning brick and -ak (ک) meaning little. In Persian -ak is a suffix which forms the diminutive.

History
Early human settlements in the lower Indus Valley found a way of cultivating and using Gossypium arboreum commonly known as tree cotton to make clothes. These civilizations are thought to have mastered the art of making cotton fabrics.

A bust of the Priest-King excavated at Mohenjo-daro, currently in the National Museum of Pakistan, shows one shoulder draped in a piece of cloth that resembles an ajrak. Of special note is the trefoil pattern etched on the person's garment interspersed with small circles, the interiors of which were filled with a red pigment. Excavations elsewhere in the Old World around Mesopotamia have yielded similar patterns on various objects, most notably on the royal couch of Tutankhamen. Similar patterns appear in recent ajrak prints.

Ajrak can be called the identity of Sindh and Sindhi people. Ajrak is a symbol of pride and respect for men and glory for women. Sindhi people also present Ajrak as gesture of hospitality to their guests.

The level of geometry on the garment comes from the usage of a method of printing called woodblock printing in which prints were transferred from geometric shapes etched on the wooden blocks by pressing them hard on the fabric.

The tradition still prevails centuries later, and people still use the same methods of production that were used in the earlier days to create an ajrak. The garment has become an essential part of the Sindhi culture and apparel of  Sindhis. Men use it as a turban, a cummerbund or wind it around their shoulders or simply drape it over one shoulder. Women use it as a dupatta or a shalwar and sometimes as a makeshift swing for children. Ajraks are usually about 2.5 to 3-meters long, patterned in intense colours predominantly rich crimson or a deep indigo with some white and black used sparingly to give definition to the geometric symmetry in design.

Ajraks are made all over Sindh, especially in Matiari, Hala, Bhit Shah, Moro, Sukkur, Kandyaro, Hyderabad, and many cities of Upper Sindh and Lower Sindh.

The ajrak is an integral part of Sindhi culture. Its usage is evident at all levels of society, and is held in high esteem, with the utmost respect given to it. According to Sindhi traditions, ajraks are often presented as gifts of hospitality to guests and presented to the person who is utterly respectable. They are also worn on festive occasions such as weddings and cultural events. Many prominent politicians from Sindh publicly wear ajraks, including the deceased former Pakistani Prime Minister, Benazir Bhutto.

Dyes
Ajrak craft products are made with natural dyes. The entire production of the products include both vegetable dyes and mineral dyes. Indigo is a key dye.

Ajrak blocks 
The most commonly observed pattern in Ajrak blocks and hence the fabric is dots between two lines, these dots are of same radius in almost all the design. These dots were initially carved out by hands, however later on brass nails were used to fill spaces between the two walls. This aspect is crucial in determining the expertise of the artisan.

Mughal era has a deep influence on these designs. The Muslims followed a sense of strong geometry in their patterns and most patterns were formed by the interaction of two or more circles. The Ajrakh blocks were designed taking inspiration from the Muslim architectural elements that form the 'Mizan' - balance and order. The repeat patterns were determined by the grid system. Abstract symmetric representation of surrounding elements and environment were used.

Honour
Sindhi Ajrak, along with Sindhi topi, is bestowed upon the guests as an honour. This serves two purposes. First it makes the guest feel comfortable with the host. Secondly, it allows the guest to appreciate the Sindhi Culture.

Modern day use

Ajrak has now become increasingly popular amongst block print lovers. Post the earthquake, there has been an increase in the demand for Ajrak, moving its status from a local tribal caste dress to a catwalk worthy craft 
This has led to a huge amount of funds and dedication from a range of brands being focused onto innovation in the block print. Newer colours have been developed, along with new blocks, techniques etc.

Ajrak has predominantly been a craft using natural dyes, making it inherently expensive. However, with the increase in demand for fast fashion products and cheaper items, chemical dyes have been utilised in Ajrak products.

See also
 Sajarak
 Bagh Print
 Sindhi Cultural Day
 Bughti cap
 Sindhi clothing
 Bagru Print

References

External links
 Ajrak Cloth from the Soil of Sindh by Noorjehan Bilgrami

Pakistani culture
Pakistani shawls and wraps
Sindhi culture